Nils Palme (26 February 1895 – 6 January 1963) was a Swedish military officer and landowner.

He was an officer at Göta Artillery Regiment before he became head of the fourth battery at the Artillery School in Jakobstad. During the hunger- and military demonstrations in 1917 in Gothenburg, he contributed to force down the demonstrations. During the Finnish Civil War, he participated on the white side as battery manager to the Battle of Länkipohja and Battle of Tampere.

Bibliography 
 Två dagar i Tavastland med detachement Ahrenberg i mars 1918. Stockholm 1936

References
 Rainer Andersson, Vad gjorde du i Finland, far? Svenska frivilliga i inbördeskriget 1918. Stockholm 1999
 Eric Appelroth, Artilleriskolan i Jakobstad. Kort historik. Jakobstad 1968

Notes

External links
 Ansedel
 Interview with Rainer Andersson
 PhpGedView: Personal information

1895 births
1963 deaths
Swedish Army officers
People of the Finnish Civil War (White side)
Swedish landowners
Nils
Place of birth missing
Place of death missing
20th-century landowners
Swedish people of Finnish descent
Swedish expatriates in Finland